Brayati Sport club, is an Iraqi sport club based in Erbil, Iraq that plays in the Iraq Division One, the second-tier of Iraqi football. The club is also known as Yaney Brayati. The name Brayati is a Kurdish term meaning “Brotherhood”.

Kits and crest
Since its establishment Brayati football club has been mainly using green home kits (with white trimmings) and white away kits (with green trimmings) which remain the club's main colours to this day.

Brayati football club's logo is also made green and white, with images of the historic and world famous Erbil Citadel and also the Mudhafaria Minare

Players

Honours

Domestic

Regional
Kurdistan Premier League
Winners (1): 2020–21

Famous Head Coaches

 Yousef Kaki
 Adel Khudhair

References

Football clubs in Erbil